Reza Mansouri (born 1948) is an Iranian physicist and a retired professor of physics at Sharif University of Technology.

Biography

Reza Mansouri received his Ph.D. in 1972 from the University of Vienna under the supervision of Roman Ulrich Sexl. He also spent five years as an Assistant Professor there. He served as Deputy Science Minister from 2001 to 2005, and is one of Iran's influential scientific policymakers. Without his efforts, Iran would not have been able to participate in international scientific collaborations such as SESAME (Middle-East Synchrotron) and the Large Hadron Collider particle accelerator at CERN in Geneva. Mansouri has a number of publications focusing on scientific development in Iran. He has received scientific honors, including the prestigious Abdus Salam prize.

He is presently a visiting professor at McGill University. Mansouri has served as the president of The Physical Society of Iran. He is one of the founders of Institute for Studies in Theoretical Physics and Mathematics and head of its Astronomy School, which is responsible for Iran's 3.4 meter national telescope (INO340).

Awards
Abdus-Salam prize

See also
Science in Iran
Intellectual movements in Iran

References

External links
List of publications

Iranian physicists
20th-century Iranian inventors
Iranian Vice Ministers
Academic staff of Sharif University of Technology
University of Vienna alumni
1948 births
Living people